Pang Junxu (born 15 February 2000) is a Chinese professional snooker player. He was awarded the "Rookie of the Year" Award in 2021.

Career 
As a result of Pang's performances on the CBSA Tour, he was awarded a two-year card on the World Snooker Tour for the 2020–21 and 2021–22 seasons.

Performance and rankings timeline

Career finals

Pro-am finals: 1

Amateur finals: 1

References

Living people
Chinese snooker players
2000 births
21st-century Chinese people